The 2020 North Dakota gubernatorial election was held on November 3, 2020, to elect the Governor and Lieutenant Governor of North Dakota, concurrently with other federal and statewide elections, including the U.S. presidential election. Incumbent Republican Governor Doug Burgum and Lieutenant Governor Brent Sanford were both re-elected to a second term.

Republican primary
The Republican Party held a state convention in the spring to endorse a single gubernatorial candidate. That candidate and his or her running mate were automatically placed on the primary election ballot. Endorsed candidates may or may not face competition from other candidates placed there by petition—as incumbent governor Burgum did in 2016. The winner of the primary appears on the general election ballot. All primary elections in North Dakota are open to all qualified North Dakota electors, regardless of party affiliation. The 2020 primary election was held on June 9.

Candidates

Nominee
Doug Burgum, incumbent Governor
Running mate: Brent Sanford, incumbent Lieutenant Governor

Eliminated in primary
Michael Coachman, U.S. Air Force veteran and perennial candidate
Running mate: Joel H. Hylden

Declined
Wayne Stenehjem, North Dakota Attorney General
Drew Wrigley, U.S. Attorney for the District of North Dakota

Results

Democratic-NPL primary
At the Democratic-NPL Party's virtual state convention on March 21, the party endorsed Shelley Lenz for governor and Ben Vig for lieutenant governor. As a result, they were automatically placed on the primary election ballot, where they did not face competition from other candidates. The primary election was held on June 9, entirely by mail and open to all qualified North Dakota electors, regardless of party affiliation.

Candidates

Nominee 
 Shelley Lenz, veterinarian and former Killdeer school board member
Running mate: Ben Vig, former member of the North Dakota House of Representatives

Declined
Joshua Boschee, minority leader of the North Dakota House of Representatives
Heidi Heitkamp, former U.S. Senator
Erin Oban, state senator
Mac Schneider, former minority leader of the North Dakota Senate

Results

Other candidates

Libertarian Party

Nominee
DuWayne Hendrickson
Running Mate: Joshua Voytek

Results

General election

Predictions

Polling

with Heidi Heitkamp

Results

Notes
 Partisan clients

 General notes

References

External links
 
 
  (State affiliate of the U.S. League of Women Voters)
 

Official campaign websites
 Doug Burgum (R) for Governor
 Shelley Lenz (D) for Governor 

2020
Governor
North Dakota